The 2008 Sunoco Red Cross Pennsylvania 500, the twenty-first race of the 2008 NASCAR Sprint Cup season and was held on August 3 of that year at Pocono Raceway in the village of Long Pond, Pennsylvania. ESPN carried the race beginning at 1 PM US EDT and MRN along with Sirius Satellite Radio had radio coverage of the  race starting at 1:15 PM US EDT. The race was sponsored by Sunoco through its official NASCAR gasoline sponsorship and will benefit the American Red Cross Southeastern Pennsylvania chapter (covering Philadelphia and the surrounding five-county region), and marked the first time since 1996 that a race at the  track has had a corporate sponsor.

Pre-Race News 
 Terry Labonte will pinch hit this week for Patrick Carpentier in the #10 Gillett Evernham Motorsports Dodge while Chad McCumbee will drive the #45 Petty Enterprises ride.  Carpentier is running in the NAPA Auto Parts 200 on Saturday (8/2) in Montreal, Quebec.

Qualifying
Jimmie Johnson took the pole position with Mark Martin and David Gilliland in the second and third positions, and Jeff Gordon starting fourth.

OP: qualified via owners points

PC: qualified as past champion

PR: provisional

QR: via qualifying race

* - had to qualify on time

Failed to Qualify: Chad Chaffin (#34).

Race Recap
After "Happy Hour" was washed out on Saturday due to rain, a mandatory caution would be flying at Lap 20, however two accidents predated them.  A rain delay held up the race with 69 laps left, and Carl Edwards would win his fourth race of the season.

Results

References 

Sunoco Red Cross Pennsylvania 500
Sunoco Red Cross Pennsylvania 500
NASCAR races at Pocono Raceway